Irish Rebellion may refer to:
 The Irish Bruce Wars 1315–1318, an attempt by members of the O'Neill clan backed by a Scottish and Irish army to make Edward Bruce the High King of Ireland. They were supported by Edward's older brother, Robert the Bruce, King of Scotland.
 The Geraldine Rebellion (1534) and the FitzGerald Rebellion against Henry VIII of England 1535 to 1537, having to do with who was supreme head of the church
 The Desmond Rebellions, which occurred in the 1560s, 1570s and 1580s in Munster
 Tyrone's Rebellion (also known as the Nine Years' War (Ireland) from 1594 to 1603, predominantly in Ulster
 O'Doherty's Rebellion, 1607
 The Irish Rebellion of 1641, a conflict between the Roman Catholic native Gaelic-Irish and Hiberno-Normans, and Protestant settlers
 The Irish Rebellion of 1798, a republican uprising against British rule of Ireland
 The United Irish Uprising of 1800, an uprising against British rule of Newfoundland
 The 1803 Irish rebellion, for independence, led by Robert Emmet
 The Young Irelander Rebellion of 1848, also called The Famine Rebellion of 1848
 The Fenian Rising of 1867
 The Easter Rising of 1916, a nationalist uprising against British rule of Ireland

See also 
 List of Irish uprisings